A Stranger Among Us is a 1992 American crime drama film directed by Sidney Lumet and starring Melanie Griffith. It tells the story of an undercover police officer's experiences in a Hasidic community. It was entered into the 1992 Cannes Film Festival. It is often cited as one of Lumet's two failures of the 1990s, the other being Guilty as Sin (1993). Despite the poor reviews suffered by both these films, Lumet received the 1993 D. W. Griffith Award of the Directors Guild of America. The film was also the first credited role for actor James Gandolfini. The shooting of the film was used as an example in Lumet’s book Making Movies.

Plot 
Hardened New York City homicide detective Emily Eden, daughter of a divorced former cop, and her partner Nick attempt to arrest two drug dealers. However, Nick is stabbed by one of the dealers, whom Emily wounds instead of alerting assistance at first. As a result, her superior Lt. Oliver temporarily takes away her gun. After Nick is hospitalized, eventually heading to recovery, while the dealers have been apprehended, Emily goes undercover to investigate the murder of a Hasidic diamond-cutter named Yaakov Klausman. She questions the family of the Hasidic rebbe, an elderly Holocaust survivor who is revered for his wisdom and compassion toward his fellow Jews. He says to her, "You and I have something in common: We are both intimately familiar with evil. It does something to your soul."

While living with the rebbe's family, Emily changes her appearance and takes a liking to his son, Ariel, a young man who works as a diamond-cutter but teaches in the yeshiva and is expected to follow his father as the next rebbe. In addition to keeping all 613 Mitzvot, he is waiting for his intended, or basherte, the daughter of a Paris rebbe whom he has not yet actually met. They are the subjects of an arranged marriage, but he believes that she is his soul mate, chosen by God. He is also studying the Kabbalah, which is regarded as rather daring for a man under 40. Its discussion of sexual intimacy is restrained but specific, as well as a metaphor for the relationship between Man and God.

Emily finds out that the "inside man" in the murder plot is the rebbe's adopted daughter Mara, who had been living a disorderly life until Yaakov introduced her to the rebbe. Afterwards, she joined the community as a repentant baalat tshuva, "one who has returned," until a person from her past approached her and she let him into the Diamond Center to steal diamonds worth about $750,000 and kill Yaakov.

Shortly after, Emily saves the rebbe's daughter Leah from being scammed by brothers Anthony and Christopher Baldessari, who claim to be Yaakov's killers. Emily instructs her second partner Levine to alert assistance and arrests the Baldessaris, but the Baldessaris manage to escape. In the ensuing chase, Levine is injured, while Emily fatally shoots the Baldessaris. Before succumbing to his wounds, Anthony admits to Emily that he and Christopher were not responsible for Yaakov's death.

Having solved the case such as Mara now an accessory to murder, Emily rejects Nick's proposal, secretly romances Ariel to overcome her personal problems, and returns to the rebbe's home with him, but finds that Mara has taken Leah hostage. After Emily attempts to negotiate, Mara knocks her out, and Ariel kills Mara with Emily's revolver, avenging Yaakov. Ariel comments that sometimes an evil deed has a partially good result. Emily is hospitalized for an examination, while the rebbe and his family bid her farewell. Ariel and his basherte Shayna Singer get married, in which a reformed Emily watches from a distance. Eventually, she returns to work and catches up with an also reformed Levine, who is on leave and invites her on a two-week trip to Aruba. However, she declines and awaits her bashert.

Cast 
 Melanie Griffith — Emily Eden, a hardened New York detective and the main protagonist.
 Eric Thal — Ariel, Leah's brother and the rebbe's adopted son.
 Mia Sara — Leah, Ariel's sister and the rebbe's adopted daughter.
 Tracy Pollan — Mara, the fiancée of Yaakov and the main antagonist.
 Lee Richardson — Rebbe, Ariel, Leah, and Mara's adopted father.
 John Pankow — Levine, Emily's second partner.
 Jamey Sheridan — Nick, Emily's first partner.
 James Gandolfini — Anthony Baldessari, a criminal and Christopher's younger brother.
 Chris Latta — Christopher Baldessari, another criminal and Anthony's older brother.
 Jake Weber — Yaakov Klausman, Mara's fiancé and Ariel's best friend.
 David Margulies — Lt. Oliver, the superior of Emily, Nick and Levine.
 Rena Sofer — Shayna Singer, Ariel's basherte.

Reception 
A Stranger Among Us received negative reviews from critics.  

Some of the criticism of A Stranger Among Us is based on comparisons with the Academy Award-winning film Witness, which has a superficially similar plot. Similarly, Lumet's earlier film Fail-Safe was unfavorably compared to Dr. Strangelove, but in that case both films have subsequently achieved cult status. Griffith's performance in the lead role has also been heavily criticized, for which her role won her the Razzie Award for Worst Actress (also for the year's Worst Picture, Shining Through), while Tracy Pollan was nominated for Worst Supporting Actress.

Setting 
Some aspects of the plot recall the 1977 murder of diamond dealer Pinchos Jaroslawicz.

Scenes from the movie were filmed in Ridgewood, Queens.  The filming of the shootout took place at the Eldridge Street Synagogue on the Lower East Side of Manhattan.

References

External links

 
 
 
 
 

1992 films
1992 drama films
Films directed by Sidney Lumet
Films set in New York City
Films shot in New York City
Hasidic Judaism in fiction
Hollywood Pictures films
American drama films
Films produced by Steve Golin
Golden Raspberry Award winning films
Films about Orthodox and Hasidic Jews
1990s English-language films
1990s American films